Norbert Werbs (20 May 1940 – 3 January 2023) was a German Roman Catholic prelate and theologian.

Born in Warnemünde, Rostock, Werbs was ordained to the priesthood in 1964. He was appointed auxiliary bishop of Hamburg in 1994, serving until his retirement in 2015. 

Werbs died in Neubrandenburg on 3 January 2023, at the age of 82.

References

1940 births
2023 deaths
20th-century Roman Catholic bishops in Germany
21st-century Roman Catholic bishops in Germany
20th-century German Roman Catholic bishops
21st-century German Roman Catholic bishops
Bishops appointed by Pope John Paul II
German Roman Catholic bishops
German Roman Catholic theologians
People from Rostock